Mecnur Çolak (7 August 1967 – 11 December 2021) was a Turkish professional footballer who played as a forward.

Biography
Çolak played for Ludogorets Razgrad in his birth country Bulgaria and in Turkey for Süper Lig clubs Sarıyer, Fenerbahçe, Denizlispor and Adana Demirspor.

He died from a brain hemorrhage related to the complications of COVID-19, on 11 December 2021, at the age of 54.

References

External links
 Player profile at tff.org

1967 births
2021 deaths
Bulgarian footballers
Turkish footballers
Association football forwards
PFC Ludogorets Razgrad players
Sarıyer S.K. footballers
Fenerbahçe S.K. footballers
Denizlispor footballers
Adana Demirspor footballers
Süper Lig players
Bulgarian Turks in Turkey
Bulgarian emigrants to Turkey
People from Razgrad
Deaths from the COVID-19 pandemic in Turkey